James M. Davis House is a historic house and national historic district located at Pelham, Spartanburg County, South Carolina.

Description and history 
It was built in 1915, and is a large two-story, wood-frame, central hall modified American Foursquare dwelling. It features a pyramidal roof with wide overhanging eaves and a one-story, full-width wraparound porch. The property includes a landscaped yard with a stacked stone wall. The house is associated with prominent local merchant and community leader James Marvin Davis, who operated Davis Mercantile from 1905 until his death in 1943. The general store was torn down in 2007.

It was listed on the National Register of Historic Places on June 7, 2010.

References

Houses on the National Register of Historic Places in South Carolina
Houses completed in 1915
Houses in Spartanburg County, South Carolina
National Register of Historic Places in Spartanburg County, South Carolina
American Foursquare architecture in South Carolina